TSS Rosstrevor was a steam turbine passenger and cargo vessel operated by the London and North Western Railway from 1895 to 1923, and the London, Midland and Scottish Railway from 1923 to 1926.

History

She was built by William Denny and Brothers for the London and North Western Railway in 1895 and put on the Holyhead - Greenore route in succession to paddle steamer Earl Spencer.

She was named after the townland in which the village of Rostrevor is located in County Down, Northern Ireland.
 
On 2 March 1896 she was grounded at Carlingford Lough. She was refloated on 7 March, repaired and returned to service.

In 1908, the TSS Rathmore replaced her on this route. Her first class accommodation was removed and she was transferred to the Holyhead - Dublin service.

She was scrapped in 1926.

References

1895 ships
Steamships
Ships built on the River Clyde
Ships of the London and North Western Railway
Ships of the London, Midland and Scottish Railway
Maritime incidents in 1896